Rudolf Bosshard (1890 – 7 February 1980) was a Swiss rower who competed in the 1920 Summer Olympics, in the 1924 Summer Olympics, and in the 1928 Summer Olympics.

In 1920 he was a member of the Swiss boat which was eliminated in the first round of the eight event. Four years later he won the bronze medal with his partner Heini Thoma in the double sculls event. In 1928 he finished seventh with his partner Maurice Rieder after being eliminated in the quarter finals of the double sculls competition.

References

External links
 profile

1890 births
1980 deaths
Swiss male rowers
Olympic bronze medalists for Switzerland
Olympic rowers of Switzerland
Rowers at the 1920 Summer Olympics
Rowers at the 1924 Summer Olympics
Rowers at the 1928 Summer Olympics
Olympic medalists in rowing
Medalists at the 1924 Summer Olympics
European Rowing Championships medalists
20th-century Swiss people